Brian North Lee FSA, (27 December 1936 in Syston, Leicestershire – 24 February 2007 in London) was a former teacher, Fellow of the Society of Antiquaries of London since 1978 and expert on bookplates, or "ex-libris" as he preferred to call them. He was a prolific author on the last, and one of the co-founders in 1972 of The Bookplate Society. He was of the Christian faith, worked in Ghana for several years and kept contact with the country, and in later life worked as a volunteer for the Terrance Higgins Trust. Lee never married.

Selected publications
The bookplate designs of Rex Whistler, 1973.
Early printed book labels, 1976.
British bookplates, 1979. 
The ex-libris of Simon Brett, 1982.
British Royal bookplates and ex-libris of related families, Scolar Press, 1992. 
Scottish bookplates. (with Sir Ilay Campbell Bt.)

References

Further reading
Obituary in The Scotsman. Archived here.

External links
Details of Brian North Lee's coat of arms:
'The Armorial Bearings of Brian North Lee F.S.A. of Chiswick', The Seaxe: Newsletter of the Middlesex Heraldry Society, no. 52 (September 2006), p. 9.
The Seaxe, no. 52 (September 2006) (scroll to page 9)
The Heraldry Gazette, NS 109 (September 2008) (scroll to page 4).

1936 births
2007 deaths
Fellows of the Society of Antiquaries of London
People from Syston